Shah Alam is a Jatiya Party (Ershad) politician and the former Member of Parliament of Rangpur-4.

Career
Alam was elected to parliament from Rangpur-4 as a Jatiya Party candidate in 1988.

References

Jatiya Party politicians
Living people
4th Jatiya Sangsad members
Year of birth missing (living people)